Loyola Institute of Technology and Management is an engineering college in Guntur, offering graduate (Masters) and undergraduate education (Bachelors) courses in engineering and technology. It is located in the suburban region of Guntur City, India. Loyola Institute of Technology & Management was established in the academic year 2001. The managing Director of the college is Balashowry Vallabhaneni and Principal of the college is BSB Reddy. 
Popularly known as "LITAM", Loyola Institute of Technology and Management is affiliated to  Jawaharlal Nehru Technological University, Kakinada and approved by AICTE. The college has well equipped laboratories and library.

Bachelor's degrees
 Mechanical Engineering
 Civil engineering
 Computer Science and Engineering
 Electronics and Communication Engineering
 Electrical Engineering
 Information Technology

Master's degrees
 Mechanical Engineering CAD/CAM
 Computer Science and Engineering
 Power electronics & drives
 Communications & signal processing
 Embedded Systems
 Master of Computer Application
 Master of Business Administration

Science & humanities departments
Chemistry Department
English Department
Mathematics Department
Physics Department

Campus
Departments

Each engineering department has its block in any of the three main building structures and all the buildings are located in close proximity. First-year students are provided with a separate department in main block.

Hostel facility

The college also offers separate hostel facilities for both boys.

Sports and games

It offers facilities for outdoor and indoor games such as cricket, hockey, football, volleyball, basketball, badminton, tennis and table tennis and chess. There is a 400 m track for athletics and the necessary equipment for jumps, throws etc. An indoor sports room is  also available.

Auditorium

Even though the college doesn't have a separate main auditorium, every department has their own activity halls. Among these halls, the one situated in ECE block has centralized A/C.

Library

LITAM has a large Central Library with thousands of volumes of books & magazines. Every newspaper and magazine available in Guntur are provided in this library for students.

Laboratories
Mechanical Engineering department in LITAM has a number of laboratories for student use. Every department has their own labs necessary for an engineering student.

LITAM Quest 

Every year, the college celebrates a two-day cultural festival where students from various departments participate, in contests conducted like Paper Presentation and quiz show.

References 

 College site
 College site// College history
 College Route map
 College Logo
 Government Website 

Jawaharlal Nehru Technological University
Universities and colleges in Guntur
2001 establishments in Andhra Pradesh